The North-West Institute of Management of the Russian Presidential Academy of National Economy and Public Administration (NWIM RANEPA)  is a federal higher educational institution situated in the center of St. Petersburg, Russia.

The Academy carries out training, retraining and improvement of professional skills of the public employees in St. Petersburg and Northwest region of Russian Federation. The Academy is one of the most authoritative and prestigious educational institutions of St. Petersburg. The Academy was founded in 1991.

The educational process is divided with 6 schools and 21 departments. Courses of instruction include full-time, part-time and correspondence programs.

 22,000 students attend full-time courses. 
 Annually 2,500 persons study on short-term advanced courses and seminars, conferences, round tables and meetings.
 4,000 employees of the executive authority attend retraining courses in management and administration fields.

Today the Academy comprises:
 School of State and Municipal Management
 School of Public Administrators Training and Retraining
 School of Law
 School of International Relations
 School of Economics and Finance
 School of Social Technologies
 Postgraduates studies in the fields of Political science, History, Law, Economics and Social studies
 Wide network of 13 branches in North-West region of Russia

Official Website

Factsheet 2018-2019

Universities and colleges in Saint Petersburg